Zen the Intergalactic Ninja is a fictional character created in 1987 by Steve Stern and Dan Cote, and initially published under their Zen Comics imprint. In the early nineties Zen was licensed to Archie Comics, and then to Entity Comics.

Publication history
Zen has been depicted by many well-known comics artists, including Paul Pelletier, Mike Mignola, and Sam Keith, as well as silver age artists Ross Andru and Mike Esposito.  Other artists who have drawn Zen include Jae Lee, Frank Brunner, and Bill Maus. The first appearance of Zen's new look was in Entity Comic's Zen #0, published in 1993.

Alien Hero is a collection of novellas and short stories about Zen, written by Steve Stern.  Zen has also appeared in magazines as varied as Mixx, published by Tokyopop, and Heavy metal.

In 2008, a new series of Zen trade paperbacks was to be launched by publisher Devil's Due.  In addition, Devil's Due has announced an all-new continuing Zen comic-book series, written by fan favorite Joe Casey and illustrated by Joe Abraham. Devil's Due published only the first book in limited amounts. When the creators refused to surrender shares in their IP, Devil's Due discontinued the project. First Comics stepped up in 2010 publishing a full immersion 3D comic. Artist/creator Dan Cote retro-fitted his Earth day annual original pen and ink book into anaglyph 3D (red/blue, readable only with anaglyph red/blue glasses). First comics published "the best of zen" in 2012. A compilation of stories including full color version of book 1, (originally published in airbrushed black and white), and ending with a short story never before published in the current digital rendering style Cote devised using a combination of 80% adobe illustrator and 20% photoshop. Sandwiched in between are stories by noted contributors throughout Zen's publishing history.

Fictional character biography
Zen is a native of the planet Baltoon, where he was raised in a test tube as part of a genetic experiment.  When the scientists in charge decided the test was a failure, they scheduled the infant Zen for termination.  He was saved by Teslah, a scientist on the project, who fired the infant into space in a transport pod.  Zen landed in the Om system, where he was found by the mysterious Masters of Om.  They raised him as an acolyte, and trained him in the martial arts.  Once grown, Zen becomes one of the finest martial artists the Omnians had known.  Zen uses his skill as a mercenary, hiring himself out to the highest bidder.

Powers and abilities
Zen is a skilled martial artist, trained in the ways of the Masters of Om.  He is a master fighter, and knowledgeable in all forms of hand-to-hand combat.

Zen also communicates through a unique type of telepathy that nobody truly understands.  He is able to simply "talk" into others' heads, allowing them to hear him as though he was simply speaking out loud.  When spoken back to him, he "hears" others though a combination of sound waves and thought patterns that he takes in as language and sound. Zen has an amazing awareness of his surroundings thanks to the fact that he "hears" more with his "mind" more than ordinary people could take in with just their ears.  This ability does not mean he can "read thoughts" on a whim though. One has to be projecting or transmitting their thoughts or intentions in order for him to be able to receive them—so if one can clear one's mind, one "might" be able to keep him in the dark.

Zen's other mental abilities allow him to dematerialize food with his mind so that he can eat—allows him to communicate with his mentors on distant planets—and even allows him to move objects through the air, including making himself hover while he meditates.

Video game
.

Merchandise
In addition to the video games, Zen was licensed for numerous products, including a set of six action figures from the Just Toys company.  Other licensed products include posters from the Starmakers company, phone cards from Patco, chromium cards from Maxx, and a vinyl model kit from Inteleg International.

References

External links

1993 video games
Archie Comics titles
Comics adapted into video games
Comics characters introduced in 1987
Devil's Due Publishing titles
Fictional ninja
Game Boy games
Konami games
Nintendo Entertainment System games
Video games about ninja
Science fiction video games
Video games based on comics
Video games with isometric graphics
Video games developed in Japan